Bagadilico, Basal Ganglia Disorders Linnaeus Consortium, is a research group in Lund, Sweden, and a Linnaeus environment, supported by the Swedish Research Council. The group consists of about 120 researchers at either Lund University or Lund University Hospital.

The group's ultimate goal is to find new therapies for Parkinson's disease and Huntington's disease. These disorders have in common that they are caused by disturbances in the part of the brain called the basal ganglia. To achieve this goal, the group wants to establish and develop a strong, multidisciplinary research environment.

The ambition with the programme is to receive knowledge that improves the patients’ quality of life, through improved therapies and methods of diagnosis, and also improves the situation for the families.

Researchers from Lund University Medical Faculty, Faculty of Engineering, Cultural Sciences and Lund University Hospital make up the group. The aim of this collaboration is for new therapies to be made available to the patients more quickly, and that ethical and cultural aspects are taken into consideration.

The medical part of the research focuses on cell transplantation, gene therapy and finding new drugs. New clinical trials where dopamine-producing cells will be transplanted into the brains of patients with Parkinson's disease are planned for 2010.

An important part of the programme is acquiring knowledge of how therapies best are designed to benefit patients, their families and the society as a whole, and to take into consideration the ethical and cultural aspects of progress in biomedical research.

The name Bagadilico is an acronym formed using the two initial letters from the words Basal Ganglia Disorders Linnaeus Consortium.


Research Groups within Bagadilico 

Development of Restorative and Neuroprotective Treatment Strategies for Parkinsons Disease 
The Neurobiology Unit aims at developing new restorative and neuroprotective treatments for neurodegenerative diseases using cell transplantation and direct in vivo gene delivery.

Neuronal Survival Unit 
The Neuronal Survival Unit is focused on pathogenetic mechanisms and pharmacological treatment in cell and animal models of Parkinson's and Huntington's diseases.

Basal Ganglia Pathophysiology 
The Basal Ganglia Pathophysiology team explores molecular and cellular plasticity in the basal ganglia after damage and/or pharmacological treatment.

Outcomes Research, Measurements and Evaluation in Parkinson's Disease 
The research involves outcomes measures intended to reflect illness from the patients’ perspective, as well as clinical assessment tools. Ongoing work involves instruments tapping areas such as motor dysfunction, perceived health, distress, and functional status.

BRAINS Unit - Brain Repair and Imaging in Neural Systems 
The BRAINS UNIT is focused on the development of new therapeutic strategies for neurodegenerative diseases. The research is a synthesis of mechanisms of repair in the brain and in vivo imaging at the systems level.

Nanobiotechnology and Lab-on-a-Chip 
The research involves the Acoustic Trapping Project aimed at performing particle and cell trapping in a perfusion based microfluidic system. The technique will provide a platform for performing cellassays in a non-contact way using ultrasonic standing waves.

CNS Gene Therapy Research Group 
The CNS Gene Therapy Team develop systems for sufficient and sustained expression of transgenes in the CNS. Gene transfer is used to express trophic factors or neurotransmitter-producing enzymes in animal models of neurodegenerative disease.

The Cultural Research Team 
The Cultural Research Team looks at the cultural aspects on neurodegenerative disorders such as Parkinson's and Huntington's disease.

Translational Neuroendocrine Research Unit 
The Translational Neuroendocrine Research Unit focuses on the neuropsychiatric Huntington's disease, and studies molecular mechanisms in the interface to depression, dementia and obesity.

Clinical Experimental Therapies in Neurodegenerative and Inflammatory Diseases 
The projects aim at transferring preclinical results into a clinical experimental therapeutics programme in Parkinsons disease, and inflammatory disorders in the nervous system.

References

Neurology organizations
Lund University
Swedish medical research
Medical and health organizations based in Sweden